Poplar Flat is an unincorporated community in  Lewis County, Kentucky, United States.

Notable native
George M. Thomas, U.S. Congressman

References

Unincorporated communities in Lewis County, Kentucky
Unincorporated communities in Kentucky